Turčianske Jaseno is a village and municipality in Martin District in the Žilina Region of northern Slovakia.

Etymology
The name is derived from Slovak jaseň (ash tree). Jaseno means "place overgrown with ash trees".

History
In historical records the settlement was first mentioned in 1274 as Jezen, Jescen. The original settlement developed into two villages. Horné Jaseno and Dolné Jaseno merged to Turčianske Jaseno in 1973.

Geography
The municipality lies at an altitude of 500 metres and covers an area of 20.465 km². It has a population of about 350 people.

References

External links
http://www.statistics.sk/mosmis/eng/run.html

Villages and municipalities in Martin District